War Memorial Gymnasium at the Sobrato Center is an athletic venue on the University of San Francisco campus in San Francisco, California.

War Memorial Gymnasium may also refer to:

 UBC War Memorial Gymnasium, on the University of British Columbia campus
 War Memorial Gymnasium (Virginia Tech)
 War Memorial Gymnasium (Wailuku, Hawaii)

See also
 War Memorial (disambiguation)